Charles Stuart may refer to:

Royalty
 Charles I of England (1600–1649), Scottish and English king, executed
 Charles II of England (1630–1685), his son, Scottish and English king
 Charles Edward Stuart (1720–1788), aka "Bonnie Prince Charlie" or "The Young Pretender", Jacobite claimant to the thrones of Scotland, England and Ireland

Peers
 Charles Stuart, Earl of Lennox (1557–1576)
 Charles Stuart, 6th Earl of Moray (died 1735)
 Charles Stuart, Duke of Kendal (1666–1667)
 Charles Stuart, Duke of Cambridge (1660–1661)
 Charles Stuart, Duke of Cambridge (1677)
 Charles Stuart, 12th Lord Blantyre (1818–1900), Scottish representative peer

Politicians
 Charles Stuart (British Army officer, born 1810) (1810–1892), British Army general and Member of Parliament for Buteshire 1832–33
 Charles Stuart (Canadian politician) (1864–1926), Canadian politician and judge
 Charles E. Stuart (1810–1887), United States Senator from Michigan 1853–59
 Charles E. Stuart (Virginia politician) (1850–1889), Speaker of the Virginia House of Delegates 1881–83
 Charles V. Stuart (1819–1880), California pioneer and delegate to the California Constitutional Convention
 Charles Stuart, 1st Baron Stuart de Rothesay (1779–1845), British diplomat, Ambassador to France and to Russia

Military
 Charles Stuart (East India Company officer) ( – 1828), Irish-born British Army General
 Charles Gage Stuart (1887–1970), Royal Navy officer and Head of the Military Government of Guernsey
 Charles Stuart (British Army officer, born 1753) (1753–1801), British general during the French Revolutionary Wars
 Charles Stuart (British Army officer, born 1810) (1810–1892), British Army general and Member of Parliament for Buteshire 1832–33

Others
 Charles Stuart (painter), British painter
 Charles Stuart (abolitionist) (1783–1865), Anglo-Canadian soldier, writer and abolitionist
 Charles Edward Stuart, Count Roehenstart (1784–1854)
 Charles B. Stuart (1814–1881), New York engineer/surveyor
Chuck Stuart (ice hockey) (born 1935), Canadian ice hockey player
 Charles Stuart (rugby union), Scottish rugby union player
 Charles Stuart (murderer) (1959–1990), American murderer
 Charles Stuart (runner) (1907–1970), Australian Olympic sprinter
 Charles Stuart of Dunearn, Scottish minister and co-founder of the Royal Society of Edinburgh
 Charles Stuart (botanist (1802-1877)

See also
 Charles Stewart (disambiguation)
 
 Charles Sturt (1795–1869), English explorer of Australia